Orzechówka may refer to the following places:
Orzechówka, Podlaskie Voivodeship (north-east Poland)
Orzechówka, Subcarpathian Voivodeship (south-east Poland)
Orzechówka, Świętokrzyskie Voivodeship (south-central Poland)